Lauchlan MacNeill Weir (1877–18 August 1939) was a Scottish Labour politician.

He was the son of Robert Weir and was educated at the University of Glasgow. He worked as a journalist and first stood for parliament in Argyllshire in 1918, but was easily beaten by the Coalition Liberal.

He was elected MP for Clackmannan and Eastern Stirlingshire in the general election of 1922, lost his seat in the National Government landslide of 1931, but won it back in 1935, holding on to it until his death in 1939.

MacNeill Weir was appointed Parliamentary Private Secretary to the first Labour Prime Minister Ramsay MacDonald in 1924 and wrote a controversial book entitled The Tragedy of Ramsay MacDonald: A Political Biography published in 1938.

He married Margaret Gillison in 1913. There were no children.

References

External links 
 

  serving alongside Robert Morrison

1877 births
1939 deaths
Scottish Labour MPs
Members of the Parliament of the United Kingdom for Scottish constituencies
Parliamentary Private Secretaries to the Prime Minister
UK MPs 1922–1923
UK MPs 1923–1924
UK MPs 1924–1929
UK MPs 1929–1931
UK MPs 1935–1945
Alumni of the University of Glasgow